Henry Wilson (27 August 1797 – 8 June 1866) was a British Liberal Party politician, and the only Liberal ever elected for the Western division of Suffolk.

At the 1835 general election he was elected to the House of Commons as one of West Suffolk's two Members of Parliament (MPs). However, he was defeated at the 1837 general election, and did not stand for Parliament again.

References

External links 
 

1797 births
1866 deaths
Liberal Party (UK) MPs for English constituencies
UK MPs 1835–1837